Mohammed Al-Mansor (born July 9, 1948) is a Kuwaiti actor. He belongs to a family of actors.

Acting work

Movies
Bas Ya Bahr
Al-Thiab la takal Al-Laham
Talah Al-Samat

He has been a great Host at local Television stations and other social media outlets. He moved with the modern times and is highly respected by all who know him. An outstanding personality in Kuwait Society.

References
Al-Qabas newspaper

1948 births
Living people
21st-century Kuwaiti male actors
Kuwaiti male film actors
Kuwaiti male stage actors
Kuwaiti male television actors
20th-century Kuwaiti male actors

ar:محمد المنصور